Australia competed at the 1972 Winter Olympics in Sapporo, Japan.

Malcolm Milne, who won an international downhill race at Val d'Isère, France in 1970, almost fell during the downhill race, denying him a chance at an Olympic medal.

Alpine skiing

Men

Speed skating

See also
Australia at the Winter Olympics

References

External links
Australia NOC
Olympic Winter Institute of Australia
"Australians at the Olympics: A definitive history" by Gary Lester  (suspected errata listed in Errata/0949853054)
"2002 Australian Winter Olympic Team Guide" PDF file
"The Compendium: Official Australian Olympic Statistics 1896-2002" Australian Olympic Committee  (Inconsistencies in sources mentioned in Wikibooks:Errata/0702234257)

Nations at the 1972 Winter Olympics
1972 Winter Olympics
Winter sports in Australia
1972 in Australian sport